Riosa is a municipality and parish (administrative division) in the Autonomous Community of the Principality of Asturias, Spain. It is situated in the central mountains of Asturias. Its capital is La Vega.

References 

Municipalities in Asturias
Towns in Asturias